Yasnyiar Gea a.k.a. Yasnyiar Bonne Gea or Bonne (born June 16, 1982) is an Indonesian female professional surfer. She has been crowned Indonesian woman champion 5 times.
She is exclusively sponsored by Billabong Asia and rides Dylan surfboard.

Career
National: 
 Indonesian Women Champion 2008, 2009, 2010, 2011, 2012
International:
 Asian Champion 2011, 2014
 Asian Beach Games 2nd 2008

References

External links
 Billabong Asia Interview

Surf contests, media interviews, and professional surf events 
 Billabong Asia
 Pemburu ombak online magazine 
 Indosurflife 
 Surf total 
 Surfing magazine 
 The women worlds tour 
 My life on board 
 Drift surfing
 Cooler lifestyle 
 Surfers village 

Living people
1982 births
Indonesian sportswomen
Female surfers
Indonesian surfers